Karol Olgierd Borchardt ( 25 March 1905 – 20 May 1986 ) was a Polish writer and captain of the Polish Merchant Marine.

Biography 
Born to Polish parents in Moscow, Karol Borchardt spent the vast majority of his life in Gdynia and died there in 1986. Borchardt gained a place in history of the Polish Merchant Marine, as an officer on Polish transatlantic liners and training sail ships. During World War II he served on two  Polish liners converted into troop transports (the m/v PIłSUDSKI and the m/v CHROBRY), and survived the loss of both. After the war he trained two generations of Polish officers. While demanding, he had a reputation as a warm-hearted and understanding teacher, and an excellent lecturer. He also became famous as the writer and chronicler of i/a Polish passenger liners. Borchardt was a very tall and strong man, and continued to practice sports into his elder years.

Works 
Borchardt's books are tributes to his captains – Mamert Stankiewicz and Eustazy Borkowski, and they are valuable additions to the record of Polish maritime history. He also wrote a book on two 'cradles' of Polish seadogs, the two sail-training vessels, "Lwów" and the "Dar Pomorza". There are many schools named after him, which is an irrefutable proof that Karol Olgierd Borchardt is still remembered as a hero of Gdynia.
He was extremely strong-willed, set goals for himself on a regular basis and, what is more, he was open-minded, caring and inquiring as well. His book Znaczy kapitan describes fascinating adventures at sea in a humorous and informative way, mostly connected with Mamert Stankiewicz. The book Szaman morski tells the tales about Eustazy Borkowski. The title is a nickname of this extraordinary sea captain, translating as sea shaman.

Achievements and legacy
In his lifetime, Borchardt was awarded:
Cross of Valour (1920 and 1941)
Cross of Merit (1957)
 Medal of Ministry of National Education of the Republic of Poland (1970)
Gdynia's President Prize (1974)
Borchardt's published works include Znaczy kapitan (1960), Krążownik spod Somosierry (1963) and Szaman Morski (1968).

The "Kapitan Borchardt", a Polish sail training three-masted gaff schooner, in service since 2011, is named after Karol Olgierd Borchardt. The Karol Olgierd Borchardt Foundation was founded in the same year, and has been a Public Benefit Organisation since 2014.

References

External links
Website of the eponymous schooner
Polish-language documentary on Borchardt

1905 births
1986 deaths
Polish male writers
Polish people of German descent
Recipients of the Cross of Valour (Poland)
Recipients of the Cross of Merit (Poland)
Academic staff of Gdynia Maritime University